The Little Saigon News is a weekly publication for the Vietnamese-American community in the United States. It is based out of Orange County, California. On April 13, 2015, The Little Saigon News filed for chapter 11 bankruptcy protection.

History 
Launched in 1985, The Little Saigon News was distributed in Orange County, and then expanded to the rest of California, then other parts of the nation, and to Canada. Its Vietnamese name, Saigon Nho, meaning “Little Saigon”, was coined by the founder, publisher, and editor, Mrs. Hoang Duoc Thao. Thao, a writer and business woman, named the newspaper before the city of Westminster, California officially called a part of the city “Little Saigon” in 1987.

Context 
Columns deal with cultural and social issues facing Vietnamese-Americans both in the United States and abroad. Staff writers create most of the content.

Sàigòn Nhỏ is the only Vietnamese newspaper distributed nationwide, and is represented in all major metropolitan cities with a sizable Vietnamese population (U.S. census data from 2000 indicates there are 1,122,528 Vietnamese people living in the United States). In 2007, the distribution network of The Little Saigon News expanded to include the cities of Toronto and Montreal among its distribution centers.

References

External links 
 

Bilingual newspapers
Mass media in Orange County, California
Vietnamese-American culture in California
Vietnamese-language newspapers published in California
Newspapers published in Greater Los Angeles
Weekly newspapers published in California